George Tyssen Butler (12 October 1943 – 21 October 2021) was a British filmmaker and photographer, and a pioneer of the theatrical documentary. Some of his most popular films include Pumping Iron (1977), which introduced a wider audience to Arnold Schwarzenegger, The Endurance films, retelling Sir Ernest Shackleton's saga of Antarctic survival, and Going Upriver: The Long War of John Kerry (2004), about his friend John Kerry's leadership in the peace movement.

Butler's films are known for their combination of high artistic, educational and entertainment values, as he believed well-crafted documentaries can hold their own against dramatic features. In addition to his feature-length documentary classics, Butler has also produced acclaimed IMAX features, such as the award-winning Shackleton's Antarctic Adventure (2001) and Roving Mars (2006).

Early life
Born in Chester, England on 12 October 1943, Butler grew up in Somalia, Kenya, and Jamaica, the son of Dorothy (West) and Tyssen Desmond Butler. He was educated at De Carteret College in Jamaica, Groton School, and the University of North Carolina at Chapel Hill.

His father was a British Army officer and received military training at Sandringham. Butler's mother was a Boston Brahmin socialite. She travelled to Kenya to marry his father during WW II, but due to war secrecy she did not know where exactly she would be meeting him (The Philadelphia Inquirer, 3 November 1940).

Butler was born in Chester, then travelled to Kenya and Somalia with his father. There, he grew up with animals, such as the gazelle he thought was his sister, accompanied by Askari warriors. The family then moved to Jamaica, where among other things his father worked to support Jamaican veterans of the Second World War. Butler came to Groton from Jamaica with an English accent, dark tan and exotic ways at odds with the staid conservatism of that school.

Career 
After earning an M.A. in creative writing from Hollins College in Virginia, Butler worked as a reporter for Newsweek. Objecting to the Vietnam War, he joined VISTA  (the domestic Peace Corps) as a volunteer, working in the inner city of Detroit's North End, where he established a successful community newspaper, The Oakland Lion. The author of a number of books, Butler collaborated with David Thorne and former Secretary of State John Kerry on The New Soldier (1971), a highly praised book about the Vietnam Veterans Against War.

In 1972, a photo assignment for Life magazine to cover the Mr. Universe Championship inspired Butler to make a theatrical documentary on the subject of bodybuilding; this proved to be a challenging undertaking, as he had difficulty convincing potential investors that bodybuilders and their Austrian-accented star performer could hold the screen. The eventual movie Pumping Iron launched Arnold Schwarzenegger, put bodybuilding and the gym business on the map, and became a film classic. With Pumping Iron, George Butler established White Mountain Films, named for the White Mountains of New Hampshire, where he made his home.

White Mountain Films has gone on to create some of the most commercially successful and critically acclaimed documentaries made. Butler's films have screened at festivals such as Sundance, Telluride, Toronto, Leningrad and Full Frame, and won honors ranging from National Board of Review Best Documentary of the Year (2001, The Endurance), IDA Best Documentary finalist (1990, In the Blood), the Whitney Biennial (2006, Going Upriver), National Academy of Science Best Science Film of the Year (2008, Roving Mars) to the Warner Prize for Best Director, Environmental Film Festival (2015, Tiger Tiger).

Photography 
Butler's photographs have appeared in many major publications including Time, Smithsonian, Vogue, Newsweek, Sports Illustrated, Vanity Fair and The New York Times. His work has been showcased in a one-man show at the International Center of Photography in New York, and exhibited in the Detroit collection, among other galleries around the country. Additionally, Butler is known for his life-size portraits of Arnold Schwarzenegger.

Unfinished projects
A lifelong conservationist (The Lord God Bird, In the Blood), Butler was working on a two-film project—a feature documentary and an IMAX film—about the imperiled tiger. Both films follow world-renowned big cat biologist Dr. Alan Rabinowitz as he travels deep into the mangrove forests of the Sundarbans, searching for its legendary royal Bengal tigers—one of the world's largest remaining tiger populations, and last hopes for the species' survival. The IMAX film is scheduled for release in 2021.

Reportedly, White Mountain Films is also developing a medical thriller probing the mystery of how "shell shock" affects the brains of soldiers and veterans. The project is based on author Caroline Alexander's National Geographic cover story.

Personal life 
Butler died from pneumonia in Holderness, New Hampshire, on 21 October 2021, at the age of 78.

Filmography
 Pumping Iron (1977)
 Pumping Iron II: The Women (1985)
 In the Blood (1989)
 The Endurance: Shackleton's Legendary Antarctic Expedition (2000)
 Shackleton's Antarctic Adventure (2001)
 Going Upriver (2004)
 Roving Mars (2006)
 The Lord God Bird (2008)
 The Good Fight  (2010)
 Tiger, Tiger (2015)
 Tiger, Tiger: The IMAX Experience (upcoming)

References

External links
 
 White Mountain Films
 Tiger, Tiger film

1943 births
2021 deaths
English photographers
British emigrants to the United States
British expatriates in Somalia
American photographers
British expatriates in Kenya